George Howard Monks (1853–1933) was an American surgeon who also invented board games.

Monks was born in Boston, Massachusetts and graduated from Harvard Medical School in 1880. Subsequently, he followed a 4-year internship in European medical centers during which he invented in 1883 the game Halma (ancient Greek for “jump”) derived from the British game Hoppity together with the mathematician Thomas Hill. Halma and the derived Chinese checkers knew great commercial success in the following years. He also invented a game called Basilinda. Monks began the practice of surgery in Boston in 1884 as he was appointed district physician of the Boston Dispensary and, later, visiting surgeon to the Carney Hospital. In 1890, he entered the Boston City Hospital and was promoted through various grades to surgeon-in-chief in 1910. From 1886 to 1926 Monks was connected with the Harvard Medical School (Department of Surgical Anatomy) but more importantly with Harvard Dental School where he was appointed Professor of Oral Surgery.

References 
 
 
 http://chinesecheckers.vegard2.net/history.html

External links 

American surgeons
Board game designers
1853 births
1933 deaths
Harvard Medical School alumni